Eucithara delacouriana is a small sea snail, a marine gastropod mollusk in the family Mangeliidae.

Distribution
This marine species if found off New Caledonia and Fiji

Description
The length of the shell attains 10.8 mm, its diameter 4.5 mm.

The ribs are rounded, narrower than the interspaces, surmounting the slight shoulder-angle and attaining the suture. The revolving striae are very fine and close. The color of the shell is white, with traces of brown staining.

The shell is conspicuous for robustness of form, and dorsally blotched with burnt-sienna marking.

References

 Crosse H. 1869. Diagnoses Molluscorum Novae Caledoniae. J. Conchyliol. 17: 177-180
 Souverbie, M. (1875) Descriptions d’espèces nouvelles de l’Archipel Calédonien. Journal de Conchyliologie, 23, 282–296. page(s): 286, pl. 13 fig. 4

External links
  Tucker, J.K. 2004 Catalog of recent and fossil turrids (Mollusca: Gastropoda). Zootaxa 682:1-1295
 Kilburn R.N. 1992. Turridae (Mollusca: Gastropoda) of southern Africa and Mozambique. Part 6. Subfamily Mangeliinae, section 1. Annals of the Natal Museum, 33: 461–575
 
 MNHN, Paris: Eucithara delacouriana

delacouriana
Gastropods described in 1869